The men's 5000 metres event at the 2010 World Junior Championships in Athletics was held in Moncton, New Brunswick, Canada, at Moncton Stadium on 24 July.

Medalists

Results

Final
24 July

Participation
According to an unofficial count, 19 athletes from 14 countries participated in the event.
{{columns-list|colwidth=22em|
 (1)
 (1)
 (1)
 (2)
 (1)
 (1)
 (2)
 (2)
 (2)
 (1)
 (1)
 (1)
 (2)
 (1)
}

References

5000 metres
Long distance running at the World Athletics U20 Championships